Rockit may refer to:

 Rockit (album), a 1979 album by Chuck Berry.
 Rockit (instrumental), a 1983 composition by Herbie Hancock.
 "Rockit", a 2004 song by Gorillaz.
 Rockit Hong Kong Music Festival, a 2000s music festival.

See also 
 Hollywood Rip Ride Rockit, a steel roller coaster at Universal Studios Florida in Orlando
 Rockit Mountain, a version of the indoor roller coaster Space Mountain at Disneyland in Anaheim, California
 Rock It (disambiguation)
 Rocket (disambiguation)